Hard light or hardlight may refer to:
 Hard and soft light in photography and filmmaking
 A type of tactile hologram in science fiction
 Hardlight, a video game development studio acquired by Sega
 "Hardlight" (song), released in 2022 by indie rock band Spacey Jane
Solid light, a theoretical state of light that is solid via strong interactions between photons